Barq va Baran, also rendered as Barq va Yaran or Bargbaran or Bargobaran, may refer to:
 Barq va Baran-e Olya
 Barq va Baran-e Sofla